The Honda EV Plus was the first battery electric vehicle from a major automaker that did not use lead acid batteries. Roughly 340 EV Plus models were produced and released. Production of the EV Plus was discontinued in 1999 after Honda announced the release of its first hybrid electric vehicle, the Honda Insight. 

The EV Plus served to test advanced battery chemistry in an electric car and also met California Air Resources Board requirements for zero-emission vehicles, like the General Motors EV1.  It also tested the pancake-style motor, electronic control unit, power control unit and the Nickel–metal hydride battery (NiMH) later used in Honda hybrids and developed further in the first Honda FCX Fuel Cell Vehicles, which were rebuilt from returned (decommissioned) EV Plus chassis.

Development
Honda began development of an electric vehicle (EV) in April 1988, inspired in part by the General Motors Sunraycer, which won the World Solar Challenge in 1987, and with an intent to meet increasingly stringent future emissions standards. The first electric vehicle team at Honda had just four people. At the time, Honda was the last automotive company in Japan to start work on electric vehicles.

Early obstacles were discovered; electric traction motors that were powerful or efficient were too large to fit, energy storage density using existing lead-acid technology was similarly too low, and the time required to recharge was inconvenient. Besides the technical challenges, California issued a Zero Emission Vehicle (ZEV) mandate in late 1990, requiring manufacturers to sell 2% of their total sales as ZEVs, starting in 1998. With that in mind, Honda devoted approximately 100 employees to begin full-scale EV development early in 1991.

A first prototype was designed, based on the existing three-door hatchback Civic, retrofitted with commercially-available electric motor and lead-acid batteries, and modified with numerous weight-saving measures, including aluminum body panels and acrylic plastic windows; it was completed in July 1991 and ran without issues. Although EV project team members were relieved that it was operable, project leader Junichi Araki was furious: "You call this a car? What the heck did you just make? Why don't you just dig a hole, and bury it!" Over the next two hours, Araki explained his anger: the finished product was a shameful compromise and merely an excuse for Honda's inexperience with EVs. "As long as we continue trying a variety of measures in a project, each car we produce must constitute a learning experience that leads to the next step. If a car doesn't lead to greater experience, we might as well not build it. I was so disappointed that they hadn't put more passion into the project." The team refocused their goal "to make a good electric vehicle, with no compromises."

As an example, the Honda EV project's powerplant team began working with battery manufacturers, proposing a battery format and size that were later adopted as a global standard. In addition, they began developing their own DC brushless motor, since commercially-available motors were not efficient enough. By June 1992, Honda had begun development of a purpose-built prototype, which led to the EV-X, a working concept vehicle exhibited at Tokyo in 1993, then powertrain testing with the Clean Urban Vehicle-4 (CUV-4), a converted Civic hatchback, gathering test data starting in August 1994. Over the next two years, the fleet of ten CUV-4s would be driven for an aggregate  in partnership with California utilities Pacific Gas & Electric (operating five) and Southern California Edison (three).

These tests convinced Honda that lead-acid batteries were unsuitable as the main storage for a production-level electric vehicle. The CUV-4 had a limited range of just , prompting tweaks to the basic vehicle specifications that were later realized in the EV Plus, including battery voltage, chemistry, and motor power. A prototype EV Plus was assembled in December 1995, and production was approved in January 1996; the first production EV Plus left the line at Takanezawa in April 1997.

Features
The EV Plus featured on-board conductive charging with the Avcon connector, passive battery balancing, regenerative braking and deceleration, AC/heat pump climate control, HID headlights, 4 seats, and electrically heated windshield. The car was equipped with an oil-fired heater for faster cabin heating and passenger comfort, but the heater was not operable until the ambient temperature was below  to comply with California ZEV standards.

The EV Plus came with a 12 V battery to power standard automotive accessories and lighting.

Vehicles also featured:
 CD player
 Power windows
 Power door locks
 Remote key fob controlled Air conditioning
 Electrically heated windshield

Performance
Track Front/Rear: 59.1in/58.7in (150cm/149cm)
Drive Train: Front-wheel drive
Occupants: Four
Transmission: Single speed with reverse
Charger: On-board conductive
Recharge: 8 hours with 240V charger, 35 hours with 120V emergency charger.
Acceleration: 4.9s (030mph)
Maximum Speed: 80+mph (130km/h)
Colors: dark green, bronze, silver

Using a 120V "emergency" charger, approximately 24 hours were required for a complete charge; in contrast, the 240V charger was able to restore 80% of charge in 2 hours. Under instrumented testing, the EV Plus required approximately 7 hours to fully charge its battery at a rate of just over 5kW.

As with virtually all vehicles, range was affected by driving style: rapid acceleration, high speeds, and fast stops lowered the all-electric range significantly.

A race-prepared EV Plus set a new record for electric vehicles at the Pikes Peak International Hill Climb in 1999 by finishing in 15:19.91. The special EV Plus, prepared and driven by Teruo Sugita, had been converted to mid-engine, rear-wheel drive and fitted with extra batteries.

Sales and production
The EV Plus was listed with an MSRP of $53,999, but Honda never allowed them to be sold, instead offering the cars on a 3-year, lease-only program for $455.00 per month. Lease customers were required to install a 220-volt charger. The lease cost included comprehensive and collision coverage, all maintenance, and roadside assistance.

The EV Plus was first available to California drivers starting on May 14, 1997, with four dealerships (three in Southern California and one in Sacramento) offering the new model; eight were leased within a week of release. By December, only 79 had been leased. From May 1997 to July 1998, Honda leased 177 EV Plus vehicles in southern California. The final EV Plus was assembled in April 1999; in total, approximately 325 were leased to customers: 300 in the United States, 20 in Japan, and 5 in Europe.

At the time Honda announced it would discontinue production, it promised to continue to re-lease and service the EV Plus indefinitely. Honda allowed some customers to extend their EV Plus lease for a few years. At the end of the leases, all EV Plus cars were taken back by Honda, decommissioned, and eventually destroyed. A few Honda EV Plus chassis were used as the base for some of Honda's first hydrogen fuel cell vehicle prototypes.

The platform and drivetrain of the EV Plus were reused for the Honda FCX, a fuel cell vehicle. Instead of the high-voltage traction battery of the EV Plus, the FCX used hydrogen stored on-board in a fuel cell reactor to generate electricity. Then those prototypes were also destroyed.

Gallery

References

External links

 Honda EV Plus Test Vehicle Report
 

EV Plus
Production electric cars
CARB's ZEV Mandate